Travelyaari.com is an Indian bus booking company headquartered at Bangalore, India. With a network of over 3,500 bus operators on its website and 150,000 bus options per day on 45,000 routes, it has served over 150 million bus travelers till date. It books 150,000-200,000 bus tickets daily through Mantis Technologies platform. It also enables 8,000-9,000 offline travel outlets to help them book bus tickets.

About
Travelyaari.com is the flagship brand of Mantis Technologies Pvt. Ltd. Mantis, through its wide range of online products (i.e. Travelyaari, BusCRS.com, IamGDS.com, BusTicketBooking API) has drastically shifted the entire bus industry in India to the Internet. Thus, making the industry more accessible, organised, transparent, efficient and collaborative. Travelyaari.com also has a tours section which offers handpicked travel packages at affordable prices.

Travelyaari is an Indian online bus ticketing website with its offices in Bangalore and other major cities like Ahmedabad, Delhi, Mumbai, Pune, and Chandigarh.

It claims to have 1.54 million monthly visits as per similarweb. and expects a turnover of about $200–250 million for the financial year ending March 2018.

Travelyaari has features in their online booking system that maintain the safety of single women passengers. It also provides insurance that provides bus travelers protection against last minute cancellations and accidents.

History
Travelyaari.com started operations in year 20 April 2007 by IIM Ahmedabad Graduates and industry professionals, Parthasarthi Sinha, Aurvind Lama and Prateek Nigam.

Mantis Technologies, Travelyaari's parent company, also develops a global distribution systems for bus operators to manage their inventories and operations.

References

External links 
 Travelyaari
 Mantis Technologies 
 MantisConnect
 IamGDS

Bus transport in India
Ticket sales companies
Indian travel websites